Michael Head may refer to:

 Michael Head (composer) (1900–1976), British composer, pianist, organist and singer
 Michael Head (popular musician) (born 1961), British singer-songwriter